Charles A. Czeisler (born 1952) is an American physician and sleep researcher. He is a researcher and author in the fields of both circadian rhythms and sleep medicine.

Background and education
Czeisler graduated from Harvard College, magna cum laude in 1974, with a degree in biochemistry and molecular biology. He received his Ph.D. in neuro- and bio-behavioral sciences and his M.D. from Stanford University. His undergraduate thesis was focused on cortisol timing release. As a graduate student at Stanford, Czeisler continued his research in Dr. William Dement's lab. Elliot Weitzman, who both worked with and mentored Czeisler, influenced Czeisler to study sleep. Today, Czeisler is the Baldino Professor of Sleep Medicine and Director of the Division of Sleep Medicine at Harvard Medical School. Additionally, he works as the Division Chief of Sleep Medicine at Brigham and Women’s Hospital in Boston, Massachusetts.

Czeisler has spent over 40 years researching the relationship between human sleep and the physiology of the human circadian clock and teaching a course at Harvard College on Circadian Biology for undergraduate and graduate students. In addition to his work at Harvard Medical School and Brigham and Women's Hospital, Czeisler is a Diplomate of the American Board of Sleep Medicine, an elected member of the Institute of Medicine, the International Academy of Astronautics and the American Clinical and Climatological Association, and a Fellow of the Royal College of Physicians, American Society for Clinical Investigation, and Association of American Physicians.

Family life 
Dr. Czeisler was one of Tibor Czeisler and Wanda Victoria Murzyn's three children. In 1993, Czeisler married Theresa Lynn Shanahan M.D. They now have three children and live in the Boston area. In his free time, Czeisler enjoys swimming, playing pickleball, and slalom waterskiing.

Research interests
Czeisler’s research focus is the neurobiology of human circadian rhythm. He examines the relationship between the circadian oscillator and sleep homeostasis, and how this interaction affects health. Czeisler's research interests encompass many areas including body temperature rhythms  and the effects of melatonin on humans (2011).

Czeisler investigates how the physiological system works to reset the circadian pacemaker. His team discovered that light transduced by non-visual input (melanopsin activation) could reset the circadian clock in patients without sight. This indicated that some blind humans can entrain to light through non-visual photoreceptors (2007). Czeisler found that intrinsically photosensitive retinal ganglion cells (ipRGCs) influence both the circadian clock and visual perception, indicating that ipRGCs contribute to “visual” light perception even in the absence of rod and cone photoreceptors. Significantly, this challenged the misconception that rod and cone photoreceptors were the sole receptors for photo-entrainment in humans. In 2002, Czeisler published a study that defended the long-held notion that mammals do not have extra-occular photoreceptors. The findings of his study definitively refute those of the famous 1998 Science publication, “Extraocular Circadian Phototransduction in Humans,” which found that bright light behind the knees can help regulated human circadian photoentrainment.

Czeisler has examined the effects of sleep deprivation on the sleep-wake cycle and circadian rhythms, and how this impacts attention performance.  He found that bright light duration impacts the circadian pacemaker, melatonin suppression, and sleepiness. He has also discovered that even room lighting can suppress melatonin production and its duration. Czeisler has also dedicated a portion of his career to examining the effects of light timing, duration, intensity, and wavelength on resetting the pacemaker through ipRGCs, which contain the photopigment melanopsin.

Czeisler’s work has many important applications. He showed that sleep deprivation could have adverse consequences affecting obesity and diabetes, among other health problems. He has also investigated the effects of chronic sleep deprivation and restriction, night shifts, and circadian disruption, on neurobehavioral performance and metabolism. Furthermore, Czeisler studied how sleep deprivation impairs the psychomotor performance of night shift workers (2009-2014), specifically surgeons (2009-2013) and residents (2010), police officers (2004-2008), and truck drivers (2012). Other research interests of his include studying wakefulness, sleep deprivation and how it can be prevented, and such influences on the clock as exercise and age. Czeisler’s research has been applied to medicine, space travel, and night occupations including shift-work.

Summary of selected contributions
 1990 – Human circadian clock is highly light sensitive.
 1995 – Blind people can still retain sleep rhythms if their eyes remain intact.
 1999 - Determined that the average circadian period in humans is 24.18 hours, not over 25 hours as previously thought.
 2002 – Invalidated findings that bright light behind the knees can impact human circadian rhythms.
 2006 – Melatonin supplementation during the day can improve sleep quality at night and can be helpful to shift workers, people with jet-lag as well as people with circadian rhythm sleep disorders.
 2006 - Task performance while chronically sleep deprived suffers severely.
 2013 – Sleep deprivation causes changes in normal gene expression and can negatively impact health.

Sleep health and occupational safety
In a 1999 interview with the Harvard Gazette regarding his team's characterization of a near-24-hour human circadian period, Czeisler noted that “accepting the near-24-hour period means that all the ideas about daily human rhythms that we take for granted must be rethought.” Understanding the internal circadian period makes problems dealing with jet-lag, night shifts, and sleep schedules in orbit more approachable

Guided by the significant real-life implications of his research, Czeisler is a strong advocate for healthy sleep habits. In consulting with the Boston Celtics and Portland Trail Blazers for the National Basketball Association (NBA), he emphasized sleep as the “third pillar of health” alongside nutrition and exercise. He instituted structural changes to the teams' schedules to allow for healthier sleep habits, including pushing morning practices into the afternoon and the '2 a.m. rule' which prevents players from traveling if they are going to arrive at their hotel later than 2:00 am.

According to Czeisler, sleep deficit poses a significant individual and public health hazard as demonstrated by the significant contribution of drowsiness to workplace accidents and motor vehicle accidents. In an interview with the Harvard Business Review, he explains that companies should seek to address this problem by setting behavioral expectations and scheduling policies for employees to avoid accruing sleep deficit.

In order to implement improved occupational sleep scheduling and sleep health standards as effective public policy, Czeisler has served on and consulted to numerous national and international health advisory agencies. As President of the National Sleep Foundation from 2005–2006, he chaired the Presidential Task Force on Sleep and Public Policy in order to develop model legislation regarding physician-in-training work hours. As a Team Leader of the Human Performance Factors, Sleep and Chronobiology Team at the NASA National Space Biomedical Research Institute, Czeisler has been responsible for developing sleep-wake schedule guidelines for NASA astronauts and mission control personnel.

Czeisler is also a member of the Brigham Health Sleep Matters Initiative,(SMI) which was created "to implement evidence-based clinical treatments for sleep and circadian disorders, and to change the culture of sleep." In 2018, the National Safety Council recognized the SMI for its outstanding commitment to safety, for which it was awarded the prestigious Green Cross for Safety Award.

A more complete listing of agencies to which Czeisler has consulted can be found at his Harvard Faculty Profile.

Honors and awards
Czeisler has earned numerous accolades and awards since 1991 for his research in sleep medicine as well as his professional advocacy for improving occupational health and safety. A few noteworthy honors include:

 Aschoff’s Rule (2001):  Awarded by the Society for Research on Biological Rhythms for his contributions to the field of Chronobiology in 2001 
 The NIOSH Director’s Award for Scientific Leadership in Occupational Safety And Health (2005): Awarded by the National Institute for Occupational Safety and Health for research on the impact of long working hours on serious medical error by interns and strategies to reduce the rate of such errors.
 The Lifetime Achievement Award (2008): Awarded by the National Sleep Foundation for outstanding contributions, professional productivity and leadership in the field of sleep medicine.
 Adrian Gold Medal (2008): Awarded by the Royal Society of Medicine to medical practitioners whose contributions to the practice of sleep medicine have been a significant advancement in the field.
 The Distinguished Scientist Award (2008): Awarded by the Sleep Research Society for significant, sustained career scientific advances in the field of sleep research.  Czeisler is Past President of the Sleep Research Society
 The Public Policy Award (2010): Awarded by the American Academy of Sleep Medicine for leading advocacy in the development of sleep-related public policy that promotes safety and occupational health.
 The Peter C. Farrell Prize in Sleep Medicine (2019): Awarded by the Harvard Medical School Division of Sleep Medicine in celebration of his life and work, specifically for his landmark discoveries in the field of human circadian rhythms, tireless advocacy for initiatives to improve sleep and circadian health, and establishment of sleep research training programs at Harvard and nationally.
 The J.E. Wallace Sterling Lifetime Achievement Award in Medicine (2019): Awarded by the Stanford Medicine Alumni Association in recognition of exceptional lifetime achievement in medicine. A video tribute to his career was made and shown at the award ceremony.
During October 2019, a Festschrift was organized to celebrate Dr. Czeisler's career. The event was held in the Harvard Biological Laboratories, where Czeiser's colleagues, former pupils, friends, and family gathered to present plenary speeches and breakthrough scientific talks. The occasion brought together researchers from six different continents.

A more complete list of these awards can be found on his Harvard Faculty Profile

References

Harvard Medical School faculty
Living people
American neuroscientists
Sleep researchers
1952 births
Harvard College alumni
Chronobiologists
Stanford University School of Medicine alumni